Montes de Oca is a canton in the San José province of Costa Rica. The head city of the canton is San Pedro.

Toponymy
Its name honors a former congressional representative from the area, Don Faustino Montes de Oca (1859–1902).

History 
Montes de Oca was created on 1 August 1915 by decree 45.

Geography 
Montes de Oca has an area of  km² and a mean elevation of  metres.

The elongated canton reaches from the suburbs of the national capital of San José eastward to the province of Cartago, and neighbors the cantons of Curridabat, San José, Cartago, and Goicoechea. The Torres River delineate a portion of the northern boundary, while the Ocloro River and Poró Creek mark the southern boundary.

Districts 
The canton of Montes de Oca is subdivided into the following districts:
 San Pedro
 Sabanilla
 Mercedes
 San Rafael

Demographics 

For the 2011 census, Montes de Oca had a population of  inhabitants. 

The canton is known for its high level of commercial development, the number of universities and other centers of higher education, and its active night life. It is one of the most urbanized and vibrant cantons in the San José area, both day and night.

Montes de Oca ranks first in the Costa Rican cantonal HDI, with 0,946.

Education

Montes de Oca is known in Costa Rica as the Cradle of Higher Education as it is home to the University of Costa Rica as well as other university-level centers of study, such as the Universidad Latina and the Universidad Americana (UAM) Escuela Laboratorio. The canton can boast of 99% literacy, compared with 95% in Costa Rica at large.

Points of interest
 Fuente de la Hispanidad (The Fountain of Hispanity), a large fountain in a major roundabout built in the mid-80s that focuses on Costa Rica's cultural heritage. It is a major landmark in the area.
 Mall San Pedro, a shopping center built in the mid-90s, contains tattoo parlors, a movie theater, a food court, video game shops, and clothing stores.
 Iglesia de San Pedro (San Pedro Catholic Church)
 Calle de la Amargura (Bitterness Street) a street centered around the nightlife of the University of Costa Rica.

Transportation

Road transportation 
The canton is covered by the following road routes:

Rail transportation 
The Interurbano Line operated by Incofer goes through this canton.

References 

Cantons of San José Province
Populated places in San José Province
Greater Metropolitan Area (Costa Rica)